Shamordino may refer to the following:
 The Kazan St Ambrose Convent in Kaluga Oblast
 The village of Shamordino, Zhukovka District, Kaluga Oblast, near which the convent is located.
 The Nuns of Shamordino Prisoners of Solovki who were prisoners in the Soviet gulags beginning in 1923.